This is a list of public art in Bristol, England. This list applies only to works of public art on permanent display in an outdoor public space. For example, this does not include artworks in museums.

Bedminster

Brislington

Broadmead

Castle Park

College Green

Clifton

Bristol Zoo

Victoria Rooms

Old City

Broad Street

Broad Quay

Corn Street

Saint Nicholas Street

The Centre

Harbourside

Millennium Square

Redcliffe

Redland

St Pauls

Spike Island

Stoke Bishop

Temple

Trinity Quay

Tyndalls Park

Westbury-on-Trym

West End

Public art formerly in Bristol

References

External links

Bristol
Culture in Bristol
Public art